Sumesh and Ramesh is an Indian Malayalam-language comedy drama film directed by Sanoop Thykoodam starring Balu Varghese and Sreenath Bhasi. The film is produced by Fareed Khan. The film is released in theatres on 10 December 2021.

Synopsis 
The film tells the story about two brothers, Sumesh and Ramesh, who live a pleasant life by playing cricket and hanging out with their friends until a tragedy strikes their family, forcing them to band together to find a solution.

Cast 

 Sreenath Bhasi as Sumesh Indukaladharan
 Balu Varghese as Ramesh Indukaladharan
 Praveena as Usha
 Salim Kumar as Indukaladharan
 Shebin Benson
 Rajesh Sharma
 Arjun Ashokan
 Chembil Ashokan
 Rony David
 Pauly Valsan as Mary
 Sudip Joshy as Doctor
 Devika Krishnan as Sreekutty
 Karthika Vellatheri as Aswathy
 Rajeev Pillai
 Sanoop Thaikudam

Production 
The story of the film is written by Sanoop Thykoodam coordinated with Joseph Vijeesh. The film was produced by Fareed Khan and co-produced by Shibu Devadath and Shaleel Azeez. While the music is composed by Neha Nair and Yakzan Gary Pereira, Alby handled the cinematography. The film is edited by Ayoob Khan.

Music

References

External links 

2020s Malayalam-language films